Nancy DeMoss Wolgemuth (born September 3, 1958), also known as Nancy Leigh DeMoss, is a bible teacher and public speaker. In 2015, DeMoss married best-selling author and a former president of Thomas Nelson Publishers Robert Wolgemuth.

References

External links
 Revive Our Hearts’ website

American evangelicals
American radio personalities
American Christian writers
Living people
1958 births